Victor Diederichs Duval (16 March 1879 – 4 October 1945) was a British suffragist. He founded the Men's Political Union for Women's Enfranchisement (MPU) in 1910.

Early life

Duval was the son of Emily Hayes and Ernest Charles Augustus Diederichs Duval, a German immigrant of potentially Jewish background. His mother and maternal aunt are both recorded as having been members of the Jewish League for Woman Suffrage. Duval came from a middle class family, all of whom supported votes for women.

His parents, as well his siblings, were fellow suffragists. Most notably his sister Elsie Duval, who was the second person to be released under the Prisoners (Temporary Discharge for Ill Health) Act 1913 (the so-called "Cat and Mouse law"), and was married to fellow suffrage campaigner Hugh Franklin.

Activism

Liberals

When the Liberal government refused to recognise women's right to vote, Duval, who was the secretary of the Clapham League of Young Liberals, resigned the party in protest, he rejoined after women in the UK were granted the right to vote.

After witnessing a woman being shovingly ejected from a Liberal gathering, he said: "The men who identify as liberals make me ashamed. They have insulted women, pulled the liberal flag into the street, and trampled on it, and for that I am ashamed of them."

MPU

The Men's Political Union for Women's Enfranchisement (MPU) was established in 1910 by Victor Duval for men who wished to support the Women's Social and Political Union (WSPU) but were unable to do so because of their sex. The MPU was non-partisan and welcomed members who shared its core values to "obtain for women the parliamentary vote on the same terms as it is or may be granted to males" regardless of their political beliefs.

When suffragette activism became more militant and women were more likely to be physically assaulted and arrested, the MPU operated as an unofficial bodyguard to protect them, putting its members at risk of serious injury, assault, and imprisonment.

Prior to this, Duval had been a committed supporter of the Women's Social and Political Union as well as the Women's Freedom League, both of which his family still supported.

Arrests & Imprisonments

Duval was arrested and imprisoned at least three times for women's suffrage. In July 1909, Duval was charged with “Aiding and abetting Marion Wallace Dunlop, in wilful and malicious damage to the stone work of St. Stephen’s Hall, House of Commons, by stamping it with an indelible rubber stamp, to the value of ten shillings. Duval went to prison again in 1910 after disrupting a meeting attended by David Lloyd George. In 1911 Duval was jailed again for five days for his activism.

Publications

Duval published a leaflet titled "An Appeal to Men" in 1910 to persuade men to take up the militant struggle for women's suffrage.

Duval later published 'Why I Went to Prison' as a political pamphlet in response to his detentions and arrests.

Marriage controversy

Before she married Duval in 1912, Suffragette Una Dugdale (1885–1945) caused a national uproar (1885–1945) by announcing she wouldn't include the term "obey" in her wedding vows, but she changed her mind after learning this could cast doubt on the legality of the marriage.  The wedding took place at Savoy Chapel. Dame Christabel Pankhurst, Lady Constance Lytton, and the Pethick-Lawrences wore WSPU colours at the wedding. The couple had two daughters.

References

1879 births
1945 deaths

English suffragists
People from Wandsworth